This is a list of Danish television related events from 1967.

Events

Debuts

Television shows

Ending this year

Births
28 April - Claes Bang, actor
10 July - Anne-Cathrine Herdorf, singer & actress
9 August - Nicolaj Kopernikus, actor
17 September - Anne Louise Hassing, actress

Deaths

See also
 1967 in Denmark